The Sealy & Smith Foundation is a charitable foundation incorporated in Texas and based in the island city of Galveston. It was established in 1922 by John Sealy, II and his sister Jennie Sealy Smith with a charter stating a mission to: 

The foundation's endowment is funded from various sources, including mineral rights in the Permian Basin.  It focuses the majority of its funding on programs supporting the healthcare and research at the University of Texas Medical Branch and its primary care facility, the John Sealy Hospital.  Since its inception the foundation has contributed more than $800 million towards construction and equipping of medical facilities on the university's Galveston campus.  In 2011 the foundation committed $170 million towards the construction of Jennie Sealy Hospital on the UTMB campus, an amount that represents the largest single gift ever to a Texas health institution.

See also

John Sealy Hospital
Rebecca Sealy Hospital

References

External links
 The Sealy - Smith Foundation website

Galveston, Texas
Non-profit organizations based in Texas
Medical and health foundations in the United States
Organizations established in 1922
University of Texas Medical Branch